Piotr Józef Cieśla (born 16 January 1955) is a former Polish handball player who competed in the 1976 Summer Olympics and won a bronze medal with the Polish team.

External links
Profile 

1955 births
Living people
Sportspeople from Gdańsk
Polish male handball players
Handball players at the 1976 Summer Olympics
Olympic handball players of Poland
Olympic bronze medalists for Poland
Olympic medalists in handball
Medalists at the 1976 Summer Olympics
20th-century Polish people